Brick City is an American documentary series on the Sundance Channel, created and directed by filmmakers Mark Benjamin and Marc Levin.  The series captures the daily drama of a community striving to improve. Against great odds, Newark's citizens and its mayor, Cory Booker, fight to raise the city out of nearly a half century of violence, poverty and corruption.

It won a Peabody Award in 2009 "for its honest and passionate exposition of the lives and institutions that make up a community, and for its inspiring yet sometimes skeptical look at the trials embedded within the struggle for a better future."

Series

Brick City premiered on September 21, 2009. The series is produced and directed by award-winning filmmakers Marc Levin (Slam, Schmatta: Rags to Riches to Rags, Gang War: Bangin' in Little Rock) and Mark Benjamin (The Last Party, Jails Hospitals and Hip-Hop), who also created the series. Academy Award-winning actor and filmmaker Forest Whitaker executive produces. Executive producers for Sundance Channel are Evan Shapiro, Sarah Barnett, Mala Chapple and Michael Klein. The production team went on to create Chicagoland, which is a successor to the show.

See also
Newark, New Jersey
Cory Booker
Garry McCarthy
Street Fight
Newark mayoral election, 2014

References

External links

 Brick City at TV Guide

2009 American television series debuts
2011 American television series endings
2000s American documentary television series
2010s American documentary television series
Cory Booker
Culture of Newark, New Jersey
Films shot in Newark, New Jersey
Sundance TV original programming
Works about New Jersey